Grand Valley Institution for Women (GVI) is a women's prison in Kitchener, Ontario, operated by the Correctional Service of Canada (CSC).

In Canada, all offenders sentenced to prison terms of greater than two years serve their time in a federal institution operated by the CSC. The Grand Valley Institution, which had a reported capacity of approximately 130 women as of April 2010, is the only federal women's prison in Ontario.

History
The prison opened in 1997. Previously Prison for Women in Kingston, Ontario was the only federal women's prison in Canada. Area neighbors initially opposed the development due to its location in Kitchener and its proximity to residential areas, but as of 2017 the opposition had died down. The housing for lower security prisoners was built first, and the housing for maximum security prisoners was built later.

On October 19, 2007, prison officials at the Grand Valley Institution observed the death of 19-year-old inmate Ashley Smith causing much controversy and legal inquest.

Composition
The majority of the prisoners live in detached buildings, or "cottages".

The prison has a secure unit for prisoners temporarily held in administrative segregation, who do not communicate with other prisoners, and those classified as maximum security prisoners, who are held in "pods" which each have five cells.

Initially the prison had a white picket fence as a boundary, but a chain-link barbed wire fence later replaced it.

Demographics
Circa 2017 the prison had 168 prisoners, with most of them each having four or fewer years remaining of their sentences, and 13 of them being classified as maximum security. Four of them had children accompanying them.

Circa 2017 the prison had 208 employees.

Programs
The program in which mothers have children with them in prison had been active since 2016 and is active as of 2017. Ryan Flanagan of CTV stated that previously the program was in "fits and starts".

Notable prisoners
 Terri-Lynne McClintic
 Jennifer Pan
 Ashley Smith
 Elizabeth Wettlaufer

References

Buildings and structures in Kitchener, Ontario
Prisons in the Regional Municipality of Waterloo
Correctional Service of Canada institutions
Women's prisons in Canada
1997 establishments in Ontario
Women in Ontario